Palaemon longirostris is a species of shrimp of the family Palaemonidae. It is considered an invasive species in the Black Sea.

References

Palaemonidae
Crustaceans described in 1837